Satupaitea Farani Tavui (born November 6, 1985) is an amateur boxer from Samoa who won the Oceania title in the light-heavyweight division in 2007 and 2008, thereby qualifying for the 2008 Olympics.

He lost his only Olympic bout against veteran Marijo Šivolija, suffering a severe knockout and being taken to Beijing's Chaoyang Hospital. He was later reported as recovering well.

References

External links
 
Oceanians 2007
Oceanians 2008,Qualifier
yahoo

1985 births
Living people
Light-heavyweight boxers
Boxers at the 2008 Summer Olympics
Olympic boxers of Samoa
Samoan male boxers